Hopper or hoppers may refer to:

Places
Hopper, Illinois
Hopper, West Virginia
 Hopper, a mountain and valley in the Hunza–Nagar District of Pakistan
Hopper (crater), a crater on Mercury

People with the name
 Hopper (surname), a list of people with the name

Insects
 Hopper, the immature form of a locust
 Grasshopper
 Hoppers, butterflies of the genus Platylesches
 Leafhopper, a member of the family Cicadellidae
 Treehopper, a member of the family Membracidae (typical treehoppers) or Aetalionidae

Mechanical parts
 Hopper, a storage container used to dispense granular materials through the use of a chute to restrict flow, sometimes assisted by mechanical agitation
 Hopper (particulate collection container), a large container used for dust collection
 A paintball loader
 A manufacturing line hopper
 Part of an agricultural aircraft to store the chemicals to be spread
 Part of a combine harvester
 Part of a wheel tractor-scraper to store the soil load
 Feeder (livestock equipment)

Transportation
 Hopper (spacecraft), a proposed spacecraft
 Hopper, a prototype test vehicle for the SpaceX Starship
 Hopper balloon, a kind of ultralight hot air balloon
 Hopper barge, a kind of barge
 Hopper car, a type of railway freight car
 Gravity wagon, or slant wagon, a type of wagon that is essentially a hopper; used in agriculture
 Space hopper, a toy: a ball with handles for bouncing on
 USS Hopper, a U.S. Navy destroyer

Arts, entertainment, and media

Fictional entities
Hopper, a character and the main antagonist in the animated film A Bug's Life
H.O.P.P.E.R.S. or Hoppers, the nickname of the fictional Huerta, California, from Jaime Hernandez's Locas graphic novels published in Love and Rockets
 Franz Hopper, a character in Code Lyoko
 Jim Hopper (Stranger Things), the police chief from the Netflix science-fiction horror series Stranger Things

Games
Hoppers (game), a peg solitaire game released by Think Fun
 Hopper, multiple clones of the video game Frogger
 Hopper, a fairy chess piece

Music
 Hopper (band), English indie rock band
 The Hoppers, a Southern Gospel family ensemble

Other uses in arts, entertainment, and media
 Dish Hopper (DVR), a service of Dish Network known for its AutoHop commercial-skipping feature

Other uses
 Hopper (food) or Appam or Aappam hoppers, a type of food in Tamil Nadu, Kerala and Sri Lankan cuisine
 Hopper (microarchitecture), codename for a microarchitecture developed by Nvidia
  Hopper, one who harvests hops
 Hopper, a Lindy Hop dancer 
 Hopper, an urban entry-level drug dealer or drug dealer's aide—typically a minor
 Bill hopper, a wooden box on the desk of the Clerk of the United States House of Representatives in which bills or resolutions to be voted on are deposited
 Hopper crystal, a type of crystal formation shaped like a hopper wagon

See also
 Hop (disambiguation)
 HOP (disambiguation)
 Grasshopper (disambiguation)